Gav Sefid may refer to:
 Gav Sefid-e Bozorg
 Gav Sefid-e Kuchek